Bupleurum aureum is a flowering plant in the family Apiaceae. The plant is native to Xinjiang, Kazakhstan, Kyrgyzstan, Mongolia, and Russia. It is a perennial plant that grows . Its habitats include open forests, mountain slopes, and river banks.

References

aureum
Flora of Kazakhstan
Flora of Kyrgyzstan
Flora of Mongolia
Flora of the Russian Far East
Flora of Siberia
Flora of Xinjiang
Plants described in 1814